Ariel Rittenhouse (born December 9, 1990) is an American diving athlete. Rittenhouse won a silver medal at the 2007 Pan American Games in Rio de Janeiro.  At the 2008 Summer Olympics, Rittenhouse placed 4th in the synchronized springboard.  Her mother, Sharon Finneran, was an Olympic swimmer who won a silver medal at the 1964 Summer Olympics.

Ariel was a diver at the Florida State University.

External links
 
 
 
 
 Ariel Rittenhouse at USC Trojans

1990 births
American female divers
Divers at the 2007 Pan American Games
Living people
People from Menlo Park, California
Pan American Games silver medalists for the United States
Pan American Games medalists in diving
Medalists at the 2007 Pan American Games
21st-century American women